Cairn Curran reservoir is situated along the Loddon River near the townships of Baringhup, Newstead and Welshmans Reef in Victoria, Australia. Constructed between 1947 and 1956.

Primarily an irrigation reservoir it is home to an active yacht club and is a popular freshwater fishing and water skiing destination. Cairn Curran reservoir is one of a chain of reservoirs along the Loddon River which also includes the Newlyn, Hepburns, Tullaroop, and Laanecoorie Reservoirs.

A 2 MW hydroelectric power station generates electricity when irrigation and flood releases are being made.

Gallery

See also

 List of dams and reservoirs in Victoria

References

External links

Lakes of Victoria (Australia)
North-Central catchment
Rivers of Loddon Mallee (region)